The Salmon River is a river in Ontario, Canada. The watershed is  about 227,579 acres (92,100 hectares) of which 65,524 acres is forested.

See also  
List of rivers of Ontario

References

External links

Rivers of Frontenac County
Rivers of Hastings County
Rivers of Lennox and Addington County
Tributaries of Lake Ontario